Khunjerab may refer to:
Khunjerab Pass, the highest paved road crossing of an international border in the world, between China and Pakistan
 Khunjerab Valley
 Khunjerab River
Khunjerab National Park, a National Park in Pakistan